Supralathosea is a genus of moths of the family Noctuidae first described by William Barnes and Foster Hendrickson Benjamin in 1924.

Species
 Supralathosea baboquivariensis Barnes & Benjamin, 1924
 Supralathosea pronuba (Barnes & McDunnough, 1916)
 Supralathosea obtusa (Smith, 1909)

References

Cuculliinae